Hermann Henselmann (3 February 1905 – 19 January 1995) was a German architect most famous for his buildings constructed in East Germany during the 1950s and 1960s.

Early years
Henselmann was born in Roßla and studied at the Kunstgewerbeschule in Berlin from 1922 to 1925. His early projects, such as a house on Lake Geneva near Montreux (1930) were Modernist in style, showing a clear Bauhaus influence, and due to this and Henselmann's partly Jewish ancestry he was prevented from working as a private architect by the Nazi government.

Socialist Realism

After the war he was appointed head architect in the city of Gotha and later in Weimar in the Soviet Zone of Germany, although his projects were subjected to harsh criticism for their Modernism. He served in Hans Scharoun's town planning group that tried to convert the Socialist Unity Party of Germany's leaders to Modernism, although unlike Scharoun, Henselmann stayed in East Berlin after their rejection. His neo-classical Weberwiese building in Berlin, emblazoned with quotes from his friend Bertolt Brecht (who had personally convinced him not to leave for the West) announced his conversion to the historical revivalism of the style known as Socialist Realism or Stalinist architecture. Henselmann would subsequently design the towers that cap each end of the Stalinallee boulevard (renamed Karl-Marx-Allee in the 1960s) at Frankfurter Tor and Strausberger Platz, which showed the influence of Karl Friedrich Schinkel as well as the 'Seven Sisters', the Stalinist 'wedding cake' skyscrapers in Moscow.

Return to Modernism

Henselmann was appointed head architect for the city of Berlin in 1953 and held various town planning positions until his retirement. After Joseph Stalin's death and the rehabilitation of Modernism, Henselmann returned to his earlier concerns, designing flagship buildings for East Berlin such as the Haus des Lehrers (House of Teachers) and Congress Hall in Alexanderplatz and the housing complex of Leninplatz (which was renamed Platz der Vereinten Nationen or United Nations Square in 1992, and its large statue of Lenin removed). Plans for a 'Signal Tower' drafted in 1958 became early drafts for the vast Fernsehturm, finished in 1969. Other late projects in a modernist and high rise style included the cylindrical Jen-Tower in Jena and a tower for the Leipzig University in the shape of an open book. Henselmann's later projects gave a modern, technocratic face to the German Democratic Republic, akin to the skyscrapers being built at the time in Frankfurt. He dismissed the brief period of Socialist Realism as a 'childhood illness', though his buildings on Karl-Marx-Allee are now protected monuments. Henselmann retired as an architect in 1972, and died in Berlin.

Selected buildings

 1929-1931: Villa Kenwin, La Tour-de-Peilz, Chemin du Vallon 19, 1820 Montreux; (Switzerland), with Alexander Ferenczy
 1931–1932: Heinecke House, Kleinmachnow (near Berlin)
 1945: Concept for "Neubauernsiedlung Großfurra", a settlement for farmers on newly cleared farms, with 30 residential hutches of the type "Thüringen" – first such settlement after World War II in Germany
 1951: Hochhaus an der Weberwiese, Berlin
 1953–1956: Towers on Frankfurter Tor and Strausberger Platz, Karl-Marx-Allee, Berlin
 1958: Study for a TV Tower (early version of the Berlin TV Tower, 1969)
 1961–1964: Haus des Lehrers, Alexanderplatz, Berlin
 1968–1970: Leninplatz, Berlin (since 1992: Platz der Vereinten Nationen)
 1968: City-Hochhaus Leipzig, formerly University of Leipzig
 1972: Jen-Tower, Jena

References
Anders Åman, Architecture and Ideology in Eastern Europe in the Stalin Era (MIT, 1988)

External links 

 Hermann Henselmann and the Architecture of German Socialist Realism- article in Slavonica
 
 Hermann Henselmann: Architect Portrait (in German)

1905 births
1995 deaths
People from Südharz
People from the Province of Saxony
German people of Jewish descent
Socialist Unity Party of Germany politicians
Members of the Provisional Volkskammer
Members of the Landtag of Thuringia
Cultural Association of the GDR members
East German architects
Modernist architects
20th-century German architects
Recipients of the National Prize of East Germany
Recipients of the Patriotic Order of Merit (honor clasp)
Academic staff of Bauhaus University, Weimar
Burials at the Waldfriedhof Zehlendorf